The High Court of the Hong Kong Special Administrative Region is a part of the legal system of Hong Kong. It consists of the Court of Appeal and the Court of First Instance; it deals with criminal and civil cases which have risen beyond the lower courts. It is a superior court of record of unlimited civil and criminal jurisdiction. It was named the Supreme Court before 1997. Though previously named the Supreme Court, this Court has long been the local equivalent to the Senior Courts of England and Wales and has never been vested with the power of final adjudication.

Composition

Eligibility and appointment 

A person who has practised for at least 10 years as a barrister, advocate, solicitor or judicial officer in Hong Kong or another common law jurisdiction is eligible to be appointed as a High Court Judge or Recorder. A person who has practised for at least 5 years as a barrister, advocate, solicitor or judicial officer in Hong Kong or another common law jurisdiction is eligible to be appointed as the Registrar or a Master.

Full-time Judges and Recorders, as well as the Registrar and Masters, are appointed by the Chief Executive on the recommendation of the independent Judicial Officers Recommendation Commission (JORC).

Part-time Deputy Judges are appointed on a temporary basis by the Chief Justice.

It is not uncommon for a person to sit as a Recorder or Deputy High Court Judge prior to appointment as a full-time High Court Judge.

Newly-appointed High Court judges with previous service as the Director of Public Prosecutions in the Department of Justice are subject to a 'sanitisation' period of 6 months upon appointment. During this period, the judge does not deal with any criminal trials or appeals or any civil cases involving the Government to maintain judicial independence and impartiality.

Upon appointment as a full-time High Court Judge, one must give an undertaking not to return to practise in future as a barrister or solicitor in Hong Kong.

The remuneration of High Court Judges is determined by the Chief Executive on the recommendation of the independent Standing Committee on Judicial Salaries and Conditions of Service. As of 1 April 2017, a full-time Judge of the Court of First Instance receives a monthly salary of HK$292,650, while a Justice of Appeal receives a monthly salary of HK$307,050. The Chief Judge of the High Court receives a monthly salary of HK$340,600. Further, full-time Judges are provided with housing in Judiciary Quarters or, alternatively, a housing allowance at HK$163,525 per month. As of 1 April 2020, Recorders and Deputy High Court Judges receive honoraria at a daily rate of HK$11,765.

The retirement age of full-time High Court Judges is 70. However, the term of office can be extended further up to the age of 75.

Chief Judge of the High Court 
The Chief Judge of the High Court is the Court Leader of the High Court and the President of the Court of Appeal. The Chief Judge is responsible for the administration of the High Court and is accountable to the Chief Justice, who is head of the Judiciary. The Chief Judge must be a Chinese citizen who is a Hong Kong permanent resident with no right of abode in any foreign country.

The Judges who have held the position of Chief Judge of the High Court of Hong Kong to date are:

 Patrick Chan Siu-oi (1997–2000)
 Arthur Leong Siu-chung (2000–2003)
 Geoffrey Ma Tao-li (2003–2010)
 Andrew Cheung Kui-nung (2011–2018)
 Jeremy Poon Shiu-chor (2019–present)

For pre-1997 Chief Justices, see: Chief Justice of the Supreme Court of Hong Kong

Full-time Judges 

Full-time High Court Judges are given the prefix ‘the Honourable’ and referred to as ‘Mr/Madam/Mrs Justice [surname]’. The Chief Judge of the High Court may be referred to in writing by adding the post-nominal "CJHC". Vice Presidents of the Court of Appeal may be referred to in writing by adding the post-nominal "VP". Justices of Appeal may be referred to in writing by adding the post-nominal "JA".

In 1995, Mrs Justice Doreen Le Pichon was the first woman to be appointed as a High Court Judge. She subsequently became the first woman to be appointed as a Justice of Appeal in 2000. In 2019, Madam Justice Susan Kwan was the first woman to be appointed as Vice President of the Court of Appeal.

The current full-time Judges of the High Court (as at 4 January 2022) are (ranked according to the priority of their respective appointments; Senior Counsels indicated by an asterisk *):

Chief Judge of the High Court
 The Hon Mr Justice Jeremy Poon Shiu-chor, CJHC

Justices of Appeal of the Court of Appeal of the High Court

 *The Hon Mr Justice Andrew Colin Macrae, VP
 The Hon Madam Justice Susan Kwan Shuk-hing, VP
 The Hon Madam Justice Carlye Chu Fun-ling, VP
 The Hon Mr Justice Peter Cheung Chak-yau, JA
 The Hon Madam Justice Maria Candace Yuen Ka-ning, JA
 *The Hon Mr Justice Aarif Tyebjee Barma, JA
 The Hon Mr Justice Derek Pang Wai-cheong, JA
 *The Hon Mr Justice Kevin Paul Zervos, JA
 The Hon Mr Justice Thomas Au Hing-cheung, JA
 The Hon Madam Justice Maggie Poon Man-kay, JA
 *The Hon Mr Justice Godfrey Lam Wan-ho, JA
 *The Hon Mr Justice Anderson Chow Ka-ming, JA
The Hon Madam Justice Anthea Pang Po-Kam, JA

Judges of the Court of First Instance of the High Court
 The Hon Mr Justice Barnabas Fung Wah, GBS
 The Hon Mrs Justice Judianna Wai-ling Barnes
 *The Hon Mr Justice Jonathan Russell Harris 
 The Hon Madam Justice Queeny Au-Yeung Kwai-yue
 The Hon Madam Justice Esther Toh Lye-ping
 The Hon Mr Justice Andrew Chan Hing-wai
 The Hon Madam Justice Mimmie Chan Mei-lan (Judge in charge of the Commercial List and the Construction and Arbitration List)
 *The Hon Mr Justice Anthony Chan Kin-keung (Judge in charge of the Admiralty List)
 *The Hon Mr Justice Peter Ng Kar-fai
 The Hon Madam Justice Bebe Chu Pui-ying 
 The Hon Mr Justice David Lok (Judge in charge of the Intellectual Property List)
 The Hon Mr Justice Joseph Yau Chi-lap
 The Hon Mr Justice Albert Wong Sung-hau
 *The Hon Mrs Justice Audrey Patricia Campbell-Moffat
 The Hon Madam Justice Susana Maria D'Almada Remedios
 The Hon Mr Justice Wilson Chan Ka-shun (Judge in charge of the Probate List)
 *The Hon Madam Justice Lisa Wong Kwok-ying
 The Hon Mr Justice Poon Siu-tung
 The Hon Mr Justice Alex Lee Wan-tang
 *The Hon Mr Justice Russell Adam Coleman (Judge in charge of the Constitutional and Administrative Law List)
 *The Hon Mr Justice Keith Yeung Kar-hung
 *The Hon Madam Justice Linda Chan Ching-fan (Judge in charge of the Companies and Insolvency List)
The Hon Mr Justice Johnny Chan Jong-herng
 *The Hon Madam Justice Anna Lai Yuen-kee
 *The Hon Madam Justice Yvonne Cheng Wai-sum

A Justice of Appeal may sit as an additional Judge of the Court of First Instance. A Judge of the Court of First Instance may also hear cases in the Court of Appeal, including as a single Judge (for example, when determining applications for leave to appeal in criminal cases).

Cases in the Court of First Instance are usually heard by a single Judge, though important cases may be heard by a bench consisting of more than one Judge, although this is very rare. This practice is similar to the English High Court, where important cases may be heard by a Divisional Court consisting of a three- or two-member bench.

All Judges of the Court of First Instance also serve as members of the Competition Tribunal. The President and Deputy President of the Competition Tribunal (currently Mr Justice Harris and Madam Justice Au-Yeung respectively) are appointed by the Chief Executive on the recommendation of the Judicial Officers Recommendation Commission.

The President of the Lands Tribunal must be a High Court Judge (currently Madam Justice Lisa Wong) and is appointed by the Chief Executive.

High Court Judges also serve a number of other public service roles. It is a statutory requirement that the Electoral Affairs Commission be headed by a Chairman who is a High Court Judge (currently Mr Justice Lok) appointed by the Chief Executive in consultation with the Chief Justice. The Electoral Affairs Commission must appoint a Judge of the Court of Final Appeal or a High Court Judge to act as returning officer for elections for the Chief Executive of Hong Kong. Similarly, it is a statutory requirement that the Chief Executive appoint a serving or retired High Court Judge to be Commissioner on Interception of Communications and Surveillance (currently Mr Justice Suffiad). The Chief Executive also appoints three to six Judges of the Court of First Instance (currently Mr Justice Fung, Mr Justice Bharwaney and Madam Justice Lisa Wong) on the recommendation of the Chief Justice to serve as panel judges handling interception and surveillance authorisation requests from law enforcement agencies. Further, it is a statutory requirement that the Chief Executive appoint at least 2 serving or retired High Court Judges as members of the Long-term Prison Sentences Review Board. At present, Mr Justice Pang Kin-kee and Mr Justice Wilson Chan are President and Deputy President respectively of the Long-term Prison Sentences Review Board. It is also a statutory requirement that the Chief Executive appoint a retired High Court Judge, District Judge or magistrate as Chairman of the Appeal Board on Public Meetings and Processions (currently Mr Justice Pang Kin-kee). In addition, it is a statutory requirement that the Chief Executive appoint a serving or retired High Court Judge or Deputy High Court Judge to chair the Market Misconduct Tribunal (MMT) and the Securities and Futures Appeals Tribunal (SFAT). At present, Mr Justice Lunn (former Vice President of the Court of Appeal), Mr Justice Hartmann (former Justice of Appeal), Kenneth Kwok SC (former Recorder of the Court of First Instance) and Judge Tallentire (former Deputy High Court Judge) are Chairmen of the MMT and SFAT.

The Chief Executive may appoint a High Court Judge to lead a public inquiry. For example, Mr Justice Andrew Chan was appointed in 2015 as Chairman of the Inquiry into incidents of excess lead found in drinking water, and Mr Justice Lunn, JA was appointed in 2012 as Chairman of the Inquiry into the collision of vessels near Lamma Island.

A number of serving and retired Hong Kong High Court Judges also sit as Supreme Court Judges in Brunei. For example, while Mr Justice Rogers served as Vice President of the Hong Kong Court of Appeal, he also sat as a non-resident Judicial Commissioner of the Supreme Court of Brunei Darussalam between 2010 and 2011. As of 2019, three retired Hong Kong High Court Judges sit as Judges of the Court of Appeal of Brunei Darussalam (Mr Justice Burrell, who is the President of the Brunei Court of Appeal, and Mr Justice Seagroatt and Mr Justice Lunn, who are Justices of Appeal); two retired Hong Kong High Court Judges sit as Judicial Commissioners of the High Court of Brunei Darussalam (Mr Justice Findlay and Mr Justice Lugar-Mawson). Another retired Hong Kong Judge, Edward Woolley, who previously sat as a Deputy High Court Judge and High Court Master, also sits as a Judicial Commissioner of the Supreme Court of Brunei Darussalam.

Recorders 

Recorders of the court of first instance of the high court are practitioners in private practice (in practice, Senior Counsel) who are appointed for a fixed term of a few years and sit for a few weeks in a year. Recorders may exercise all the jurisdiction, powers and privileges of a full-time Judge of the Court of First Instance.

The recordership scheme was introduced in 1994 to encourage experienced practitioners who are willing to sit as a High Court Judge for a few weeks every year, but are not prepared to commit themselves to a permanent, full-time appointment. It was intended to act as a more formal system of appointment compared to the more ad hoc nature of appointment of Deputy High Court Judges.

The current Recorders of the Court of First Instance of the High Court (as at 4 January 2022) are (ranked according to the priority of their respective appointments):
 Ms Winnie Tam Wan-chi, SC of Des Voeux Chambers
 Mr Stewart Wong Kai-ming, SC of Temple Chambers
 Mr Eugene Fung Ting-sek, SC of Temple Chambers
 Mr Charles Peter Manzoni, SC of Temple Chambers
Mr Martin Hui Siu-ting, SC of Plowman Chambers
Ms Sit Yat-wah, SC of Temple Chambers
Ms Rachel Lam Yan-kay, SC of Des Voeux Chambers
Mr Wong Ming-fung, SC of Des Voeux Chambers
Mr Victor Dawes, SC of Temple Chambers
Mr Richard Khaw Wei-kiang, SC of Temple Chambers
Mr José-Antonio Maurellet, SC of Des Voeux Chambers
Mr Abraham Chan Lok-shung, SC of Temple Chambers
Mr Pao Jin-long, SC of Temple Chambers
Ms Maggie Wong Pui-kei, SC of Plowman Chambers
Mr Derek Chan Ching-lung, SC of Plowman Chambers

Part-time Deputy Judges 

The Chief Justice appoints on a temporary basis a number of serving full-time District Court Judges, retired High Court Judges and practitioners in private practice (in general, barristers who are Senior Counsel or solicitors who are senior partners with litigation experience) to sit as part-time Deputy High Court Judges. Before 1983, the position of Deputy High Court Judge was known as Commissioner.

A Deputy High Court Judge may exercise all the jurisdiction, powers and privileges of a full-time Judge of the Court of First Instance.

Judicial review cases are not listed before part-time Judges.

In order to ensure judicial independence and impartiality, part-time Judges are not permitted to participate actively in political activities (although membership of a political party is acceptable).

Forms of address 

All High Court Judges (regardless of whether they are full-time Judges, Recorders or Deputy Judges on temporary appointment) are addressed in court as "My Lord" or "My Lady".

In court judgments and decisions, Vice Presidents of the Court of Appeal are referred to as '[surname] VP' or '[surname] V-P' (or in the plural as '[surname] and [surname] V-PP'). Justices of Appeal are referred to as '[surname] JA' (or in the plural as '[surname] and [surname] JJA'). Full-time Judges of the Court of First Instance are referred to as '[surname] J' (or in the plural as '[surname] and [surname] JJ'). Recorders are referred to as 'Mr/Madam/Mrs Recorder [surname]' (with the post-nominal 'SC' if they are Senior Counsel). Deputy High Court Judges are referred to either as 'Deputy Judge [surname]', 'Deputy High Court Judge [surname]' or 'DHCJ [surname]' (with the post-nominal 'SC' if they are Senior Counsel). Deputy High Court Judges were previously called Commissioners and were referred to as 'Mr/Madam/Mrs Commissioner [surname]' (with the post-nominal 'Q.C.' if they were Queen's Counsel) in judgments before 1983.

High Court Building 

The High Court Building is located at 38 Queensway, Admiralty. The 20-storey building was built in 1985 as the home of the then Supreme Court of Hong Kong, which was renamed in 1997. It was named the Supreme Court Building, and the road leading to its main entrance is still named Supreme Court Road. The High Court Building was designed by Architect K. M. Tseng.

The structure is a white clad tower and has a water fountain outside its front door.

Sometimes, the High Court may sit in another venue. For example, a serving District Judge sitting as a Deputy High Court Judge may hear a case in a courtroom situated in the District Court building. This is similar to England, where the High Court sometimes sits outside London in County Courts which act as High Court District Registries.

Cases 
In the Jimmy Lai case, the prosecution asked the High Court for an adjournment from 1 December 2022 to 8 December 2022; the High Court added a few more days and adjourned it until 13 December 2022. On 13 December 2022, the High Court further delayed the trial until September 2023, until after the NPCSC ruled in the matter.

See also 

Judiciary of Hong Kong
Law of Hong Kong
Supreme Court (Hong Kong)
Chief Justice of the Supreme Court of Hong Kong

Notes

References

External links 

 Hong Kong Judiciary website, High Court page

Judiciary of Hong Kong